The Security of the Succession, etc. Act 1701 (13 & 14 Will. 3. c. 6) was an Act of the Parliament of England. The Act required nearly all office-holders to take the oath of abjuration against James Francis Edward Stuart, pretender to the throne, self-styled Prince of Wales and son of the former King James II.

The Act also made it high treason to "compass or imagine" the death of Princess Anne of Denmark, the heir apparent to the throne, with effect from 25 March 1702. This clause never came into force however, since Anne became queen on 8 March 1702.

Another Act (1 Anne c.9) (actually passed in 1702 but backdated to 1701, the date the session of Parliament began), amended the Coin Act 1696, which concerned treason by counterfeiting coins.

Notes

See also
Correspondence with James the Pretender (High Treason) Act 1701

High treason in the United Kingdom
Treason Act

Treason in England
Acts of the Parliament of England
1701 in law
1701 in England
Succession to the British crown
James Francis Edward Stuart